The Digha–Asansol Express is an Express train belonging to Eastern Railway zone that runs between  and  in India. It is currently being operated with 13505/13506 train numbers on six days in a week basis.

Service

The 13505/Digha–Asansol Express has an average speed of 48 km/hr and covers 372 km in 7h 50m. The 13506/Asansol–Digha Express has an average speed of 47 km/hr and covers 372 km in 8h.

Route and stops 

The important stops of the train are:

 
 
 
 
 
 
 
 
 
 
 
 
 
 
 
 
 
 Burnpur

Coach composition

The train has standard ICF rakes with a maximum speed of 110 kmph. The train consists of 7 coaches:

 5 general
 2 seating cum luggage rake

Traction

Both trains are hauled by an Asansol Loco Shed-based WAG-5 or WAM-4 electric locomotive from Digha to Asansol and back.

Rake sharing 

The train shares its rake with 13501/13502 Haldia–Asansol Express.

See also 

 Digha railway station
 Asansol Junction railway station
 Haldia–Asansol Express
 Digha–Malda Town Express

Notes

References

External links 

 13505/Digha-Asansol Express
 13506/Asansol-Digha Express

Transport in Digha
Transport in Asansol
Express trains in India
Rail transport in West Bengal
Railway services introduced in 2010